The spectacled fulvetta (Fulvetta ruficapilla) is a bird species in the family Paradoxornithidae. Like the other typical fulvettas, it was long included in the Timaliidae genus Alcippe or in the Sylviidae.

It is found in China. Its natural habitat is temperate forests.

References

Sources
 BirdLife International 2004.  Alcippe ruficapilla.   2006 IUCN Red List of Threatened Species.   Downloaded on 24 July 2007.
 Collar, N. J. & Robson, C. 2007. Family Timaliidae (Babblers)  pp. 70 – 291 in; del Hoyo, J., Elliott, A. & Christie, D.A. eds. Handbook of the Birds of the World, Vol. 12. Picathartes to Tits and Chickadees. Lynx Edicions, Barcelona.

spectacled fulvetta
Birds of Central China
Birds of Yunnan
Endemic birds of China
spectacled fulvetta
Taxonomy articles created by Polbot